New Milford High School may refer to:

New Milford High School (New Jersey), New Milford, New Jersey
New Milford High School (Connecticut), New Milford, Connecticut

See also
Milford High School (disambiguation)